Nossis was a Hellenistic poet from Epizephyrian Locris in Southern Italy.  Eleven or twelve of her epigrams survive in the Greek Anthology.

Life
Nossis was from Epizephyrian Locris in Magna Graecia (modern Locri, Calabria).  She was probably from a noble family.  According to one of her surviving epigrams, her mother was called Theuphilis and her grandmother was Cleocha.  Based on her epitaph of the dramatist Rhinthon, she can be dated to the early third century BC.  The sophistication of her poetry suggests that she was relatively well-educated.

Work
Nossis is one of the best preserved Greek women poets, with twelve four-line epigrams attributed to her preserved as part of the Greek Anthology.  The authorship of one of these is uncertain – the heading it is given in the Anthology may mean "in the style of Nossis" or "allegedly by Nossis".  Like other Hellenistic poets, Nossis probably published her epigrams; it is disputed whether they were also inscribed, or were purely literary productions.  Two of Nossis' epigrams preserved in the Greek Anthology may have originally been the opening and closing poems of Nossis' own collection; these are not inscriptional and would have been composed for the book.

The majority of Nossis' epigrams are about women.  One of these poems (preserved as A. P. 5.170) is modeled after Sappho's fragment 16. Meleager of Gadara mentions Nossis in his Garland, where he describes her as a love poet, though only one of her surviving epigrams is about love.

Nossis primarily wrote epigrams for religious dedications and epitaphs; four of these are dedications of women's portraits. Her epigrams were inspired by Sappho, whom she claims to rival.  She may have also been influenced by Erinna and Anyte.

Reception
Nossis is not mentioned by later commentators or lexicographers, and does not seem to have entered the Greek literary canon.  She was still known in the first century BC, when Meleager of Gadara included her in his Garland, and in the Augustan period she is one of nine female poets in an epigram by Antipater of Thessalonica.  One of her epigrams is parodied by Cillactor, and two of Herodas' Mimes allude to her.

References

Works cited

Further reading 
 Gigante, M. 1974. “Nosside.” PP 29: 22–39.
 Gow, A. S. F., and D. L. Page, eds. 1965. The Greek Anthology: Hellenistic Epigrams. 2 vols. Cambridge.
 Gutzwiller, K. J. 1998. Poetic Garlands: Hellenistic Epigrams in Context. Berkeley, Los Angeles and London.
 Skinner, M. B. 1989. “Sapphic Nossis.” Arethusa 22: 5–18.
 Skinner, M. B. 1991. “Nossis Thêlyglôssos: The Private Text and the Public Book.” In S. B. Pomeroy, ed., Women’s History and Ancient History. Chapel Hill and London: 20–47.
 Skinner, M. B. 2001. “Ladies’ Day at the Art Institute: Theocritus, Herodas, and the Gendered Gaze.” In A. Lardinois and L. McClure, eds., Making Silence Speak: Women's Voices in Greek Literature and Society. Princeton, N.J., 201–22.
 Skinner, Marilyn B. "Aphrodite Garlanded: Erôs and Poetic Creativity in Sappho and Nossis". in Rabinowitz, Nancy Sorkin and Auranger, Lisa. Among Women: From the Homosocial to the Homoerotic in the Ancient World. University of Texas Press, Austin. 2002.

External links
 
   Text of her 12 surviving epigrams

4th-century BC women writers
4th-century BC writers
3rd-century BC women writers
3rd-century BC writers
3rd-century BC poets
Epigrammatists of the Greek Anthology
Poets of Magna Graecia
Doric Greek poets
Epizephyrian Locrians
Ancient Greek women poets
4th-century BC Greek women
3rd-century BC Greek women